Stockton Unified School District (SUSD) is a school district headquartered in Stockton, California. Most of the city of Stockton is served by SUSD.

History
Stockton Unified School District serves nearly 40,000 students at 55 k-12 and high schools. The diverse district includes dependent and independent charters, large comprehensive high schools and smaller secondary schools focused on such specialty areas as health careers, academic rigor, law and technical career pathways.

SUSD boasts three high schools named U.S. News & World Report top high schools in the country, a nationally recognized AVID Demonstration high school, and gold winning jazz bands and Mariachis. Stockton Unified leadership is shared by its powerful Peer Leaders Uniting Students teams, which set school climates for every elementary and high school. The district's newest program is the Public Safety Academy, preparing students for careers in law enforcement, fire safety, emergency response and other areas of public protection.

Boundary
In addition to the majority of Stockton, the district also serves the unincorporated commmunities of August, Country Club, Garden Acres, Kennedy and Taft Mosswood.

Schools

Elementary schools

 Adams Elementary School
 August Elementary School
 Bush Elementary School
 Cleveland Elementary School
 Commodore Stockton Skills Elementary School
 El Dorado Elementary School
 Elmwood Elementary School
 Fillmore Elementary School
 Fremont-Lopez Elementary School
 Grunsky Elementary School
 Hamilton Elementary School
 Harrison Elementary School
 Hazelton Elementary School
 Henry Elementary School
 Hong Kingston Elementary School
 Hoover Elementary School
 Huerta Elementary School
 Kennedy Elementary School
 King Elementary School
 Kohl Open Elementary School
 Madison Elementary School
 Marshall Elementary School
 McKinley Elementary School
 Monroe Elementary School
 Montezuma Elementary School
 Nightingale Elementary School
 Peyton Elementary School
 Primary Years Academy
 Pulliam Elementary School
 Rio Calaveras Elementary School
 Roosevelt Elementary School
 San Joaquin Elementary School
 Spanos Elementary School
 Taft Elementary School
 Taylor Elementary School
 Tyler Elementary School
 Van Buren Elementary School
 Victory Elementary School
 Washington Elementary School
 Wilson Elementary School

High schools
 Cesar Chavez High School
 Edison High School
 Franklin High School
 Jane Frederick High School
 Stagg High School
 Stockton High School (1904-1948)
New Vision High School

Specialty Schools And Programs
 Health Careers Academy
 Merlo Institute of Environmental Technology
 Pacific Law Academy
 School for Adults
 Stockton Early College Academy 
 Stockton Public Safety Academy
 Walton Special Center
 Weber Institute of Applied Sciences and Technology

Charter schools
 Pittman Charter 
 Nightingale Charter

References

External links
 

School districts in San Joaquin County, California
School districts established in 1852
Education in Stockton, California
1852 establishments in California